Bath power station supplied electricity to the City of Bath and the wider area from 1890. The station was originally built and operated by the City of Bath Electric Lighting and Engineering Company Limited. The power station was on a site in Dorchester Street adjacent to the Old Bridge over the River Avon. The City of Bath Corporation assumed ownership in 1897. The power station was redeveloped several times: including a major rebuilding with new equipment in the 1920s. The station was closed in the late 1960s and was subsequently demolished.

History
Bath City Council had applied in October 1882 for a provisional order under the Electric Lighting Act 1882 to supply electric lighting to the city. However, it rescinded the application in December 1882 having decided not to proceed with the scheme. In 1889 the City of Bath Electric Lighting and Engineering Company Limited was founded to provide electric lighting. This included 81 public arc lights and private lighting. The company built Bath power station (51°22'40"N 2°21'32"W) on Dorchester Street north east of the Old Bridge. It first supplied electricity on 24 June 1890.

In 1896 Bath Corporation applied for a Provisional Order under the Electric Lighting Acts to generate and supply electricity to the town. This was granted by the Board of Trade and was confirmed by Parliament through the Electric Lighting Orders (No.7) Act 1896 (59 & 60 Vict. c. clxxv). The Bath Corporation acquired the company undertaking on 7 January 1897 at a price of £24,533.

Equipment specification
The original plant at Bath power station comprised four Babcock and Wilcox boilers, eight vertical Brush compound engines coupled by ropes to Mordey dynamos; and ECC alternators driven by Polliitt and Wizzell engines. In 1898 the generating capacity was 900 kW and the maximum load was 375 kW. There were about 14,000 lamps of 8 candle power.

In 1911 the Corporation installed a Diesel engine and generator with an output of 450 kW. The cost off the generator and ancillaries was £7,500.

First World War and post-war plant
Following the First World War new plant was installed to meet growing demand for electricity. By 1923 the plant comprised:

 Coal-fired boilers generating a maximum of 54,000 lb/h (6.8 kg/s) of steam, these supplied steam to:
 Generators
 1 × 200 kW reciprocating engine (DC)
 2 × 250 kW reciprocating engines (DC)
 1 × 500 kW reciprocating engine (DC)
 2 × 350 kW reciprocating engines (AC)
 1 × 1,500 kW steam turbine (AC)

These gave a total generating capacity of 1,200 kW of Direct Current, and 2,200 kW of Alternating Current.

Electricity supplies were available to consumers as 220 and 440 Volts DC; single phase, 100 Hz AC at 110 Volts.

New plant 1921–1930
New plant was commissioned in 1921–1930.

 Boilers
 1 × Clayton water tube oil fired 20,000 lb/h (2.52 kg/s), steam conditions 210 psi and 625 °F (14.5 bar, 329 °C),
 3 × Babcock and Wilcox water tube 40,000 lb/h (5.04 kg/s), steam conditions 210 psi and 625 °F (14.5 bar, 329 °C),
 1 × Thompson 60,000 lb/h (7.6 kg/s), steam conditions 210 psi and 700 °F (14.5 bar, 371 °C).

The boilers had a total evaporative capacity of 200,000 lb/h (25.2 kg/s), and supplied steam to:

 Turbo-alternators:
 2 × 1.5 MW Brush-Ljungstrom, 6.6 kV
 1 × 3 MW Brush-Ljungstrom, 6.6 kV, installed in 1924.
 2 × 7 MW Brush-Ljungstrom, 6.6 kV, installed in 1926 and 1930.

The completed total installed generating capacity was 20 MW, with an output capacity 16 MW.

Condenser cooling water was drawn from the River Avon.

Operations
In 1898 maximum electricity demand was 375 kW.

In 1909 the City Council sought a variation to its Order of 1896 to extend the area of supply to include Bath Rural District, within 3 miles of the Guildhall. The order was confirmed in 1910, and sanctioned by Parliament by the Electric Lighting Order Confirmation (No.4) Act, 1910 (10 Edw. 7 & 1 Geo. 5 c. lxxviii).

In 1921 the City Council examined the possibility of using hydro power to generate electricity. The chairman of the electricity committee and the city engineer visited Chester where a scheme was in operation. However, it was decided not to proceed with such a scheme in Bath.

Operating data 1921–23
The operating data for the period 1921–23 is shown in the table:

Operating data 1946
Bath power station operating data, 1946.

Under the terms of the Electricity (Supply) Act 1926 (16-17 Geo. 5 c. 51) the Central Electricity Board (CEB) was established in 1926. The CEB identified high efficiency ‘selected’ power station that would supply electricity most effectively; Bath was designated a selected station. The CEB also constructed the national grid (1927–33) to connect power stations within a region. The Bath undertaking was part of the South-West England and South Wales Electricity scheme. In the first quarter of 1935 the Corporation sold to the CEB over 6 MWh of electricity and purchased from the CEB over 11 MWh. Over the period 1935 to 1948 the Corporation sold to the CEB an average of 28 GWh a year and purchased from the CEB an average of 103 GWh a year.

Upon nationalisation of the British electricity supply industry in 1948 under the provisions of the Electricity Act 1947 (10-11 Geo. 6 c. 54) the Bath electricity undertaking was abolished, ownership of Bath power station was vested in the British Electricity Authority, and subsequently the Central Electricity Authority and the Central Electricity Generating Board (CEGB). At the same time the electricity distribution and sales responsibilities of the Bath electricity undertaking were transferred to the South Western Electricity Board (SWEB).

In 1948 the Bath Corporation had 23,108 consumers and supplied electricity to an area of 25.41 square miles (65.8 km2).

Operating data 1954–63
Operating data for the period 1954–63 is shown in the table:

In 1958 the Bath electricity district supplied an area of 214 square miles and a population of 148,800. The amount of electricity sold and the number and types of consumers was as follows:

In 1958 the above totals were made up of the following:

Closure
Bath power station was decommissioned in the late 1960s. The buildings subsequently demolished and the area has been redeveloped.

See also

 Timeline of the UK electricity supply industry
 List of power stations in England

References

Coal-fired power stations in England
Demolished power stations in the United Kingdom
Former power stations in England
1890 establishments in England
Buildings and structures in Bath, Somerset